Mithali Dorai Raj (born 3 December 1982) is an  Indian cricketer and former captain of the India women's national cricket team from 2004 to 2022. Mithali is the highest run-scorer in women's international cricket and is considered one of the greatest female cricketers of all time. Mithali is the recipient of several national and international awards, including the Wisden Leading Woman Cricketer in the World in 2017, Arjuna Award in 2003, the Padma Shri in 2015, and Major Dhyan Chand Khel Ratna in 2021.

Mithali holds numerous records in international cricket. She is the only female cricketer to surpass the 7,000-run mark in Women's One Day International matches. She is the first player to score seven consecutive 50s in ODIs. She also holds the record for most half-centuries in WODIs. 

In 2005, Mithali became the permanent captain of India. She is the only female player to have captained India in more than one ICC ODI World Cup final, doing so twice in 2005 and 2017. 

In June 2018, during the 2018 Women's Twenty20 Asia Cup, she became the first player from India to score 2000 runs in T20Is and also became the first female cricketer to reach 2000 WT20I runs.

On 1 February 2019, during India's series against New Zealand Women, Mithali became the first woman to play in 200 ODI matches. In September 2019, she announced her retirement from T20Is to focus on ODI cricket. In 2019, she became the first woman to complete 20 years in international cricket.

In July 2021, Mithali broke Charlotte Edwards' record of 10,273 runs to become the player with the most runs in women's international cricket. 

On 8 June 2022, Mithali announced her retirement from all formats of international cricket.

Early life
Mithali Raj was born on 3 December 1982, in Jodhpur, Rajasthan. Her mother is Leela Raj, and her father, Dorai Raj, was a warrant officer in the Indian Air Force. She lives in Hyderabad, Telangana. 

Mithali started playing cricket at the age of ten. She did her intermediate schooling at Keyes High School for Girls in Hyderabad and Kasturba Gandhi Junior College for Women in Secunderabad. She began receiving cricket coaching in elementary school, alongside her older brother.

Domestic career 
Mithali played for Air India alongside Purnima Rau, Anjum Chopra, and Anju Jain before joining Railways for the domestic championship. She has played for the Supernovas and Velocity in the Women's T20 Challenge.

International career
Mithali has played all three of India's cricket formats: Test, ODI, and T20. She was named among the probables for the 1997 Women's Cricket World Cup when she was fourteen, but did not make it to the final squad. She made her ODI debut in 1999 against Ireland at Milton Keynes and scored an unbeaten 114 runs. She made her Test debut in the 2001–02 season against South Africa at Lucknow. 

On 17 August 2002, at the age of 19, she broke Karen Rolton's world record for the highest individual test score of 209* in her third test, scoring a new high of 214 against England in the second and final test at County Ground, Taunton. The record has since been surpassed by Kiran Baluch of Pakistan, who scored 242 against the West Indies in March 2004.

Mithali led India to their first finals in 2005 Women's Cricket World Cup, in South Africa, where they lost to Australia.

In August 2006, she led the side to their first-ever Test and series victory in England, and concluded the year by successfully defending the Asia Cup without losing a single game.

Mithali was the winner of the Arjuna award for 2003. 

At the 2013 Women's World Cup, Mithali was the number 1 woman ODI cricketer. In her career , She scored one century and four fifties in Test cricket, five centuries and five fifties in ODIs, together with best bowling figures of 3–4 in ODIs, and ten fifties in T20s.

In February 2017, she became the second player to score 5,500 runs in ODIs.
Mithali is the first player to captain most matches for India in ODI and T20I.

In July 2017, she became the first player to score 6,000 runs in WODIs. She led the Indian team to the final of the 2017 Women's Cricket World Cup where the team lost to England by nine runs.

In December 2017, she was named as one of the players in the ICC Women's ODI Team of the Year.

In October 2018, she was named in India's squad for the 2018 ICC Women's World Twenty20 tournament in the West Indies.

Mithali retired from T20I cricket in September 2019, saying in a BCCI press statement: "After representing India in T20 internationals since 2006, I wish to retire from T20Is to focus my energies on readying myself for the 2021 one-day World Cup".

In November 2020, Mithali was nominated for the Rachael Heyhoe-Flint Award for ICC Female Cricketer of the Decade, and the award for women's ODI cricketer of the decade.

In May 2021, she was named captain of India's Test squad for their one-off match against the England women's cricket team. In January 2022, she was named captain of India's team for the 2022 Women's Cricket World Cup in New Zealand.

On 8 June 2022, Mithali announced her retirement from all formats of International cricket.

Coaching career
Mithali was appointed batting consultant for India women's national cricket team, and has played as a player-coach.

Records

 Mithali is nicknamed "Lady Tendulkar of Indian Women's cricket", as she is currently the all-time leading run-scorer for India in all formats, including Tests, ODIs and T20Is.
 During the 2017 Women's Cricket World Cup, Mithali scored her seventh consecutive half-century and made a record for most consecutive fifties by a player.
 Mithali is the 1st Indian and 5th woman cricketer overall to score over 1,000 World Cup runs.
 She holds the record for playing the most consecutive Women's One Day Internationals for a team (109).

Mithali Raj was involved in controversy with cricket management due to her attitude towards the game during the 2018 ICC Women's World Twenty20. She accused the coach Ramesh Powar and BCCI COA member Diana Edulji in a letter to the BCCI of bias, and of humiliating her by not including her in the T20 world cup semifinals. Powar, in turn, criticized Mithali for threatening to retire from cricket when asked to play down the batting order. He also accused Mithali of 'blackmailing and pressuring coaches' apart from causing division in the team during the recently concluded World T20. He added, "despite being a senior player in the team she puts in minimum inputs in team meetings. She could not understand and adapt to the team plan. She ignored her role and batted for own milestones. Lack of keeping the momentum going which was putting extra pressure on other batters." Mithali's 50 against Ireland in the same tournament in which she ended up playing 25 dot balls was also criticized by coach Powar.

Her relationship with the T20 team's captain Harmanpreet Kaur is also said to be strained. However, after reappointment of Ramesh Powar as Head Coach of the Indian women's cricket team in May 2021, the two have reconciled. Mithali and Harmanpreet also confirmed in various interviews that there is no bad blood between them.

Awards

Outside cricket

Personal life and interests 
She is a Bharatanatyam dancer.

In popular culture 
After the 2017 Women's Cricket World Cup, Viacom 18 Motion Pictures acquired the rights to make a feature film on Mithali's life. She said, "Hoping that this movie inspires more people, especially young girls to take up sports as a career."

Shooting was scheduled to start in 2019. Mithali said "I think Priyanka Chopra will be a great choice (to play me in the biopic). Our personalities match a lot. I am not a movie buff, so I'd love the experts to do their job." However, finally it was decided that Taapsee Pannu would play the role of Mithali Raj in the biopic named Shabaash Mithu. It was to be directed by Rahul Dholakia in 2020; however, as filming was delayed to 2021 due to COVID-19, in June 2021, Srijit Mukherji replaced him as director. The film was released on 15 July 2022. The movie was a financial disaster, earning only rupees 2.88 crore from a budget of 30.0 crore.

References

Citations

Further reading

External links 

 
 
 
 

1982 births
Living people
Air India women cricketers
Central Zone women cricketers
Cricketers from Hyderabad, India
Indian women cricketers
Indian women cricket captains
India women Test cricketers
India women One Day International cricketers
India women Twenty20 International cricketers
People from Jodhpur
Railways women cricketers
IPL Supernovas cricketers
IPL Velocity cricketers
Recipients of the Arjuna Award
Recipients of the Padma Shri in sports
Sportswomen from Rajasthan
Women cricketers who made a century on One Day International debut
BBC 100 Women
Wisden Leading Woman Cricketers in the World
Recipients of the Khel Ratna Award
21st-century Indian women
21st-century Indian people